South Shore or Southshore may refer to:

Places

Canada 
South Shore (Montreal), Quebec, the region of the greater Montreal area on the south shore of the Saint Lawrence River
South Shore (Nova Scotia), geographic region of Nova Scotia
South Shore—St. Margarets, the riding that covers that part of Nova Scotia

United States 
 South Shore, California (disambiguation)
South Shore, Alameda, California
South Shore, Chicago, Illinois, a neighborhood
Chicago South Shore and South Bend Railroad, freight rail line from Chicago, Illinois to South Bend, Indiana
South Shore, Kentucky, a city
South Shore (Long Island), southern edge of Long Island in New York state
South Shore (Massachusetts), a region south of Boston
South Shore (Pittsburgh), Pennsylvania, a neighborhood
South Shore, South Dakota, a town
South Shore, Staten Island, New York, a series of neighborhoods in New York City
South Shore Lake Tahoe, towns on the southern perimeter of Lake Tahoe on the border between California and Nevada
South Shore School District, Port Wing, Wisconsin

Elsewhere 
South Shore, Blackpool, England
Southshore, New Zealand

See also
South Shore Line (disambiguation)
South Shore Mall (disambiguation)